Su-Hyun Oh (born 23 May 1996) is a South Korea-born Australian professional golfer. She became the number one ranked amateur in the world in October 2013.

Born in Busan, South Korea, Oh moved to Australia at the age of eight and has played golf since the age of nine. In 2009, at 12, she was the youngest player to ever qualify for the Women's Australian Open. She finished tied for second at the 2013 Australian Ladies Masters, a tournament on the ALPG Tour and Ladies European Tour.

Oh turned professional in the fall of 2014.  She made it to the final stage of the 2014 LPGA Qualifying School, but failed to earn an LPGA Tour card, leaving her with eligibility on the satellite Symetra Tour.

She finished second in her professional debut at the 2015 Oates Victorian Open, then a week later won her second start as a professional, the 2015 Volvik RACV Ladies Masters in Australia.  The win earned her a two-year exemption on the Ladies European Tour.

In January 2022, Oh won the Australian WPGA Championship by 4 strokes at Royal Queensland Golf Club.

Amateur wins
2010 Victorian Girls Championship
2011 Aaron Baddeley International Junior, GNJGF Junior Masters
2012 Australian Girls' Amateur, Srixon International Junior Girls Classic, Dunes Medal, Port Phillip Open Amateur & Victorian Women's Amateur Championship
2013 Lake Macquarie Amateur, Port Phillip Open & Victorian Women's Amateur Championship
2014 WA 72 Hole Stroke Play

Source:

Professional wins (2)

Ladies European Tour (1)

1 Co-sanctioned by the ALPG Tour

ALPG Tour wins (2)

1 Co-sanctioned by the Ladies European Tour

Results in LPGA majors
Results not in chronological order before 2019.

CUT = missed the half-way cut
WD = withdrew
NT = no tournament
T = tied

Team appearances
Amateur
Espirito Santo Trophy (representing Australia): 2014 (winners)
Queen Sirikit Cup (representing Australia): 2012, 2013 (winners)

Professional
International Crown (representing Australia): 2016, 2018
The Queens (representing Australia): 2016

References

External links

Audio interview

Australian female golfers
ALPG Tour golfers
Ladies European Tour golfers
LPGA Tour golfers
Olympic golfers of Australia
Golfers at the 2016 Summer Olympics
Australian people of Korean descent
South Korean emigrants to Australia
Sportspeople from Busan
1996 births
Living people